Vera Kostina (born 1932) is a Soviet former swimmer. She competed in the women's 200 metre breaststroke at the 1952 Summer Olympics.

References

1932 births
Living people
Soviet female swimmers
Olympic swimmers of the Soviet Union
Swimmers at the 1952 Summer Olympics
Place of birth missing (living people)